The  was a Japanese domain of the Edo period. It was associated with  Iwami Province in modern-day Shimane Prefecture.

In the han system, Tsuwano was a political and economic abstraction based on periodic cadastral surveys and projected agricultural yields.  In other words, the domain was defined in terms of kokudaka, not land area. This was different from the feudalism of the West.

History
The Meiji-era author Mori Ōgai was the son of a Tsuwano retainer.

List of daimyōs 
The hereditary daimyōs were head of the clan and head of the domain.

Sakazaki clan, 1601–1617 (tozama;  30,000→43,468 koku)
Sakazaki Naomori

Kamei clan, 1617–1868 (tozama; 43,000 koku)

Kamei Masanori
Kamei Koremasa
Kamei Korechika
Kamei Koremitsu
Kamei Korenobu
Kamei Koretane
Kamei Norisada
Kamei Norikata
Kamei Korenao
Kamei Korekata
Kamei Koremi

See also 
 List of Han
 Abolition of the han system

References

External links
 "Tsuwano" at Edo 300 

Domains of Japan